Otoe County is a county in the U.S. state of Nebraska. As of the 2010 United States Census, the population was 15,740. Its county seat is Nebraska City. The county was formed in 1854, and was named tor the Otoe Indian tribe.

In the Nebraska license plate system, Otoe County is represented by the prefix 11 (it had the 11th-largest number of vehicles registered in the county when the license plate system was established in 1922).

Geography
Otoe County lies on the east side of Nebraska. Its east boundary line abuts the west boundary lines of the states of Iowa and Missouri (across the Missouri River). The terrain of Otoe County consists of rolling hills which drop down to the river basin, and rich soil. The area is largely devoted to agriculture (corn, soybeans, milo, wheat, and fruit orchards).

Otoe County derives its name from the Otoe Indians, who lived in the area.

Major highways

  U.S. Highway 75
  Nebraska Highway 2
  Nebraska Highway 43
  Nebraska Highway 50
  Nebraska Highway 67
  Nebraska Highway 128

Adjacent counties

 Cass County - north
 Fremont County, Iowa - northeast
 Atchison County, Missouri - east
 Nemaha County - southeast
 Johnson County - south
 Gage County - southwest
 Lancaster County - west

Demographics

As of the 2000 United States Census there were 15,396 people, 6,060 households, and 4,229 families in the county. The population density was 25 people per square mile (10/km2). There were 6,567 housing units at an average density of 11 per square mile (4/km2). The racial makeup of the county was 97.42% White, 0.29% Black or African American, 0.22% Native American, 0.25% Asian, 0.03% Pacific Islander, 1.14% from other races, and 0.65% from two or more races. 2.45% of the population were Hispanic or Latino of any race.

There were 6,060 households, out of which 32.50% had children under the age of 18 living with them, 59.70% were married couples living together, 7.20% had a female householder with no husband present, and 30.20% were non-families. 26.40% of all households were made up of individuals, and 14.10% had someone living alone who was 65 years of age or older. The average household size was 2.48 and the average family size was 3.01.

The county population contained 26.30% under the age of 18, 6.40% from 18 to 24, 26.10% from 25 to 44, 22.80% from 45 to 64, and 18.30% who were 65 years of age or older.  The median age was 40 years. For every 100 females there were 96.20 males. For every 100 females age 18 and over, there were 91.80 males.

The median income for a household in the county was $37,302, and the median income for a family was $45,295. Males had a median income of $30,682 versus $21,520 for females. The per capita income for the county was $17,752. About 5.90% of families and 8.10% of the population were below the poverty line, including 9.30% of those under age 18 and 7.70% of those age 65 or over.

Communities

City
 Nebraska City (county seat)
 Syracuse

Villages

 Burr
 Douglas
 Dunbar
 Lorton
 Otoe
 Palmyra
 Talmage
 Unadilla

Census-designated place
 Woodland Hills

Politics
Otoe County voters have been very Republican since World War II, like most rural Nebraska counties. In no presidential election has the county supported the Democratic nominee since voting in 1932 for Franklin Delano Roosevelt.

Education
School districts include:

 Conestoga Public Schools
 Elmwood-Murdock Public Schools
 Freeman Public Schools
 Johnson-Brock Public Schools
 Johnson County Central Public Schools
 Norris School District 160
 Nebraska City Public Schools
 Palmyra District OR-1
 Sterling Public Schools
 Syracuse-Dunbar-Avoca Schools
 Waverly School District 145

Nebraska Center for the Education of Children Who Are Blind or Visually Impaired, a state-operated educational facility, is in the county.

See also
 National Register of Historic Places listings in Otoe County, Nebraska
 Nebraska City News-Press

References

 
Nebraska counties on the Missouri River
1855 establishments in Nebraska Territory
Populated places established in 1855